Amrou Moustafa (born 12 July 1972) is an Egyptian boxer. He competed at the 1996 Summer Olympics and the 2000 Summer Olympics.

References

1972 births
Living people
Egyptian male boxers
Olympic boxers of Egypt
Boxers at the 1996 Summer Olympics
Boxers at the 2000 Summer Olympics
Place of birth missing (living people)
African Games medalists in boxing
Heavyweight boxers
African Games silver medalists for Egypt
Competitors at the 1999 All-Africa Games
21st-century Egyptian people
20th-century Egyptian people